Choi Eunmi (The romanization preferred by the author according to LTI Korea ) (born 1978) is one of the few South Korean novelists of the twenty-first century to incorporate Buddhist cosmology into her fictional universe. However, her novels are a far cry from portraying a merciful and benevolent Western Paradise. In Choi's view, people are no different than animals that follow instinct over reason, or hungry ghosts characterized by stinginess, greed, and jealousy. Naturally, the world where such people live and interact with one another, as Choi sees it, is hell. Her second short story collection Mokryeon jeongjeon (목련정전 Lotus Canon) is a chilling portrayal of hell, except she chooses to tell it like an old folk tale. The title piece "Mokryeon jeongjeon" draws on Buddhist themes, having been adapted into a short story from the Buddhist scripture Lotus Sutra.

Book reviewer Geum Jeong-yeon objects to seeing Choi's fictional realm as a kind of survival-of-the-fittest natural world that existed before the dawn of civilization:

"But that cannot be a sufficient answer; humans are animals, but nature is not hell. What creates hell is therefore not our animal side but our human side—things like our ability to think, use language, build relationships, and create societies. If these are the source of our damnation, then there can be no salvation. We have no choice but to live in hell because we are human. Does this sound like a trap to you? There is no need to raise the alarm, however. This is (of course) a novel, and Choi is a bit of a mischievous writer who enjoys pushing her characters into her elaborately designed hell and observing how they fare. But don’t let your guard down either. You'll realize that the hells of reality depicted by the nine short stories in Mokyreon jeongjeon are scenes you’ve already seen several times elsewhere. That is, here, in twenty-first-century South Korea. If you find Choi's version of hell shocking, that’s probably why."

Life 
Choi Eunmi was born in 1978 in Inje County, Gangwon Province, South Korea. She studied history at Dongguk University. She made her literary debut in 2008 when her short story "Ulgo ganda" (울고 간다 I Cry and Go) won the Hyundae Literary Award for New Writers. From her early twenties, she took undergraduate classes in novel writing and theory, and began practicing to write. After graduating university she worked for a publisher and for the Jogye Order Buddhist Studies Institute as a researcher. During her time at the institute, Choi recounts reading banghamrok, which are records of zen meditations performed by various monks, and being fascinated by the footnotes and scribbles that gave her insight into the monks’ lives. She also interviewed eminent monks while compiling records on contemporary and modern Buddhist history. Choi stated in an interview that a dominant theme in her novels is avidya, a Buddhist term describing the conditions that restrict and agonize a person's life, and that she wants to write about people who suffer and love because of avidya.

Writing 
Choi's novels may be seen as tragedies in the Aristotelian sense, or as depictions of hell in the Buddhist sense. Either way, what should be noted is how she portrays the world as a place of suffering. In the afterword to Choi's first short story collection Neomu areumdaun kkum  (너무 아름다운 꿈 A Dream Too Beautiful), literary critic Gwon Hui-cheol discusses tragedy:

"Choi Eunmi's novels deserve to be hailed as superb works of tragedy. But one must not misunderstand the term 'tragedy' . . . Tragedy is not an art of resignation for the weak. It explores the subjects of sadness, pain, or adversity only to see if they can be repeated or made positive. By turning those subjects into something positive, can life be enriched? Can life's treasure box finally be opened? Tragedy is an art that tests one’s will or drive to ask such questions . . . Choi Eunmi's novels initially seem like they were written in the belief that life is equivalent to receiving a guilty verdict. But the stories eventually lead to finding ‘a dream too beautiful’ and uncovering life's innocence and joys, which is precisely what makes them successful tragedies. Perhaps Choi's novels prove that reading tragedy is an attempt to turn moments of sadness and languor steeped in nihilism into joy and vigor—that is, to live life fully. We read tragedy to keep on living."

Critic Kim Hyeong-jung, who wrote the afterword to Choi's second short story collection, points out two characteristics of her novels. First, Kim observes that she often employs old literary forms such as myths, legends, or fairy tales. Her forte, according to Kim, is to "borrow from traditional genres like folklore or fairy tales, introduce changes to them, and in doing so, make their conventions, narrative forms, ideologies, etc. feel unconventional." Second, Kim argues that Choi's fictional universe is hellish: "Ultimately, the hell that Choi Eunmi has built does not seem to have any exits. It has been predetermined on several levels—structurally, biologically, and psychologically. And that world resembles Avīci, because being 'predetermined' entails that any other possibilities are ruled out."

Works 
 『목련정전』, 문학과지성사, 2015년,  { Lotus Canon. Moonji, 2015. }
 『너무 아름다운 꿈』, 문학동네, 2013년,  { A Dream Too Beautiful. Munhakdongne, 2013. }

Awards 
 2017: Munhakdongne Young Writers' Award for "Nuneuro mandeun saram" (눈으로 만든 사람 A Person Made from Snow)
 2015: Munhakdongne Young Writers' Award for "Chang neomo gyeoul" (창 너머 겨울 Winter Beyond the Window) 
 2014: Munhakdongne Young Writers' Award for "Geunlin" (근린 Vicinity)
 2008: Hyundae Literary Award for New Writers for "Ulgo ganda" (울고 간다 I Cry and Go)

Further reading 
 양경언, 오혜진, 윤재민, 이재경, ｢리뷰 좌담_그때 저도 거기에 있었어요!-2014년 겨울의 한국소설｣, 『문학동네』, 2015년 봄호. { Yang, Gyeong-eon, Hye-jin Oh, Jae-min Yun, and Jae-gyeong Lee. "Book Discussion: I Was There Too Then! Korean Novels of 2014 Winter".  Munhakdongne, 2015 Spring Issue. }
 ｢삶은 이해할 수 없는 재난…최은미 소설집 『목련정전』｣, 『매일경제』, 2015년 10월 22일. { "Life is an Unfathomable Disaster: Choi Eunmi's Short Story Collection Lotus Canon". Maeil Business Newspaper, October 22, 2015. }
 ｢곰팡이처럼…끝없는 번식이 빚어내는 아비지옥｣, 『한국일보』, 2015년 11월 2일. { "Avīci Born from Endless Breeding...Like Fungi." Hankook-Ilbo, November 2, 2015. }
 최은미·김남혁, ｢최은미 작가 인터뷰｣, 『웹진 문지』, 2010년 12월 1일. { Choi, Eun mi, and Nam-hyeok Kim. "Interview with Writer Choi Eunmi". Webzine Moonji, December 2, 2010. }

References 

1978 births
Living people
Dongguk University alumni
People from Inje County
South Korean writers
South Korean women writers